The 2007–08 Genoa C.F.C. season is the 1st since the promotion from the 2006-07 Serie B season. This article lists its season results, transfers, and statistics.

Current squad

Main transfers and loans

Summer 2007

In

Out

Winter 2007–08

In

Out

Competitions

Serie A

League table

Matches

Goal scorers 
19 goals
  Marco Borriello

4 goals
  Giuseppe Sculli

4 goals
  Julio César de León

3 goals
  Marco Di Vaio
  Luciano Figueroa
  Abdoulay Konko
2 goals
  Marco Rossi
1 goal
  Alessandro Lucarelli
  Matías Masiero
  Omar Milanetto
  Andrea Masiello
  Danilo

References

External links
 http://en.eufo.de/

Genoa C.F.C. seasons
Genoa